United States House of Representatives House Resolution 121 is a resolution about comfort women which Japanese-American Congressman Mike Honda of California's 15th congressional district introduced to the American House of Representatives in 2007. It asks that the Japanese government apologize to former comfort women and include curriculum about them in Japanese schools, citing the 1921 International Convention for the Suppression of the Traffic in Women and Children that Japan has ratified and United Nations Security Council Resolution 1325. This resolution was passed on July 30, 2007.

Controversy
Seiji Yoshida's memoirs were used as an evidence for the roundup of over 1,000 women in Korea in a Congressional Report which was prepared for this resolution.

Washington Post advertisements 
On June 14, 2007, a group of conservative Japanese politicians, academics, and others ran an advertisement in The Washington Post critical of the resolution. The ad was in response to a previous advertisement by a group of Korean comfort women survivors that ran in The Washington Post in support of the resolution, titled The Truth about Comfort Women.

See also 

 Kono Statement

References

External links 
 
 Remarks of Chairman Lantos on H. Res. 121, regarding Comfort Women, at committee markup  by Tom Lantos
 Original Washington Post advertisement The advertisement run in the Washington Post in April 2007 to mobilize American policymakers and public to support Resolution 121.   
Washington Post advertisement  A response by a conservative leaning group of Japanese politicians and academics to the issue of comfort women, which mentions Resolution 121.

2007 in American politics
2007 in international relations
July 2007 events in the United States
Japan–United States relations
Comfort women
United States House of Representatives resolutions
2007 in Japan
110th United States Congress